Charles Howell may refer to:

 Charles Howell (British politician) (1905–1974), British Labour Party politician
 Charles Augustus Howell (1840–1890), art dealer and alleged blackmailer
 Charles Henry Howell (1824–1905), architect of lunatic asylums in England
 Charles R. Howell (1904–1973), American Democratic Party politician
 Charles Howell III (born 1979), American golfer
 Charles Andrew Howell III (born 1930), American businessman and politician
 Charles Gough Howell (1894–1942), Welsh lawyer and British colonial official
 Charlie Howell (1874–1934), Australian rules footballer